47 Boötis is a binary star system in the northern constellation of Boötes, located 261 light years away from the Sun. It has the Bayer designation k Boötis; 47 Boötis is the Flamsteed designation. The system is visible to the naked eye as a faint, white-hued star with a combined apparent visual magnitude of 5.58. It is moving closer to the Earth with a heliocentric radial velocity of −13 km/s.

The primary member of the system, designated component A, is an A-type main-sequence star with a stellar classification of A0 Vs. The 's' indicates sharp lines as it has a moderate rotation rate with a projected rotational velocity of 55 km/s. It is a suspected variable star of unknown type. The star has 2.46 times the mass of the Sun and is radiating 46 times the Sun's luminosity from its photosphere at an effective temperature of 10,130 K.

References

A-type main-sequence stars
Binary stars
Boötes
Bootis, k
Durchmusterung objects
Bootis, 47
133962
073841
5627
Suspected variables